Bergen Commuter Rail, sometimes called Vossebanen, is a commuter rail service between Bergen and Arna, Voss and Myrdal, Norway. It is operated by Vy Tog using Stadler FLIRT electric multiple units. It runs on the mainline Bergen Line and all services terminate at Bergen Station.

Service
Vy operates on half-hour headways from Bergen to Arna, through the Ulriken Tunnel, the only way under the Ulriken mountain. There are further 16 departures each way to Voss, of which six stop only at Arna and Dale before Voss, not allowing trips Bergen-Arna/Bergen-Dale, while ten stop at all stations, giving three services per direction an hour between Bergen and Arna. Three services continue from Voss to Myrdal.

The operational deficits are financed by the Norwegian Ministry of Transport and Communications. Tickets are sold by Vy and Entur. Fares are not integrated with Skyss, the county transit authority, or any of the bus operators in Hordaland.

Station list 
Currently, the Bergen-Voss-Myrdal commuter rail service is single-tracked, with double tracking at most stations.

Future expansion

Double track in the Ulriken Tunnel is currently under construction. This will allow NSB to increase headway to 15 minutes to Arna, and increase services on the Bergensbanen. The tunnel boring machine made the breakthrough in August 2017 with the new tunnel set to open in 2020. The former tunnel will then go through renovation works with the opening date for the completed double track set to 2024.

References 

Norwegian State Railways
Commuter rail systems in Norway
1883 establishments in Norway
Railway services introduced in 1883